Shankar Prasad Jaiswal (9 August 1932 – 3 January 2016) was an Indian politician and was Member of Parliament for three consecutive terms in the 11th, 12th & 13th Lok Sabhas. Jaiswal represented the Varanasi constituency of Uttar Pradesh and was a member of the Bharatiya Janata Party political party.

Education & background
Shankar Prasad Jaiswal was born in Varanasi, Uttar Pradesh in 1932. His highest attained educational qualification is Matriculation degree.

Before entering politics, he was a social worker. He died in 2016.

Politics

Jaiswal, was elected for Lok Sabha for three consecutive terms from Varanasi constituency. Although he was elected for three straight terms, he remained in office for a total of eight years only (from 1996 to 2004). Prior to becoming MP, he was also a member of Uttar Pradesh Legislative Assembly (1969–1974) and held charge of whip in Uttar Pradesh Legislative Assembly (1969–1970).
During his political career, Jaiswal also held several party positions in the Bharatiya Janata Party.

Posts held

See also

11th Lok Sabha
12th Lok Sabha
13th Lok Sabha
Politics of India
Parliament of India
Government of India
Varanasi (Lok Sabha constituency)

References

India MPs 1996–1997
India MPs 1998–1999
India MPs 1999–2004
1932 births
Bharatiya Janata Party politicians from Uttar Pradesh
Bharatiya Jana Sangh politicians
Lok Sabha members from Uttar Pradesh
Politicians from Varanasi
Uttar Pradesh MLAs 1969–1974
2016 deaths
Uttar Pradesh MLAs 1977–1980